Aswad may refer to:

 Aswad, a British reggae group
 Aswad (name), a male Arabic given name that means "black"
 Hajarul Aswad, the black stone in the center of the Grand Mosque in Mecca
 Tell Aswad, an archaeological site near Damascus in Syria.
 Association for the Study of the Worldwide African Diaspora (ASWAD)